The axiom of equity was proposed by Samuel Clarke, an English philosopher, in the spirit of the ethic of reciprocity.

In his book A Discourse Concerning the Unchangeable Obligations of Natural Religion, and the Truth and Certainty of the Christian Revelation, Clarke wrote: 

Hastings Rashdall, in his 1907 book The Theory of Good and Evil, restated the axiom as:

References
 Liberal Utilitarianism and Applied Ethics Matti Hayry, 1994
 Ethics (second edition) by William K. Frankena, 1973
 The Theory of Good and Evil by Hastings Rashdall, 1907.

Ethical principles